Zachary Brooke (1716–1788) was an English clergyman and academic, Lady Margaret's Professor of Divinity at the University of Cambridge.

Life
The son of Zachary Brooke, a graduate of Sidney Sussex College, Cambridge (B.A. 1693-4, and M. A. 1697), and at one time vicar of Hawkston-cum-Newton, near Cambridge, was born in 1716 at Hamerton, Huntingdonshire. He was educated at Stamford school, and was admitted a sizar of St. John's College, Cambridge, 28 June 1734. He was subsequently elected a fellow there, proceeded B.A. in 1737, M.A. in 1741, B.D. in 1748, and D.D. in 1753.

He was elected to the Margaret professorship of divinity at Cambridge in 1765, and was at the same time a candidate for the mastership of St. John's College. He was chaplain to the king from 1758, and was vicar of Ickleton, Cambridgeshire, and rector of Forncett St. Mary and St. Peter, Suffolk. He died at Forncett on 7 August 1788. He had married the daughter of W. Hanchet.

Works
He attacked the Free Inquiry of Conyers Middleton in his Defensio miraculorum quæ in ecclesia christiana facta esse perhibentur post tempora Apostolorum, Cambridge, 1748, which appeared in English in 1750. This work called forth several 'Letters' in reply. Brooke was also the author of a collection of sermons, issued in 1763.

References

Attribution

1716 births
1788 deaths
Alumni of St John's College, Cambridge
18th-century English Anglican priests
Fellows of St John's College, Cambridge
People educated at Stamford School
People from Hamerton
Lady Margaret's Professors of Divinity
People from Forncett